The Plenty River is a perennial river of the Port Phillip catchment, located in the north-eastern Greater Melbourne region of the Australian state of Victoria.

Course and features
The river descends  over its  course.

The river is impounded by the Toorourrong Reservoir and is the source of Melbourne's first major water supply reservoir, the Yan Yean Reservoir, completed in 1857.

Along the lower reaches of the river, both the Plenty River Trail and the Rosanna Golf Club can be located.

See also

 Plenty, Victoria
 Lower Plenty, Victoria

References

Melbourne Water catchment
Rivers of Greater Melbourne (region)
Tributaries of the Yarra River
Shire of Nillumbik
City of Whittlesea
City of Banyule